In mathematics, the Kronecker delta (named after Leopold Kronecker) is a function of two variables, usually just non-negative integers. The function is 1 if the variables are equal, and 0 otherwise:

or with use of Iverson brackets:

For example, whereas .

The Kronecker delta appears naturally in many areas of mathematics, physics and engineering, as a means of compactly expressing its definition above.

In  linear algebra, the  identity matrix  has entries equal to the Kronecker delta:

where  and  take the values , and the inner product of vectors can be written as

The restriction to positive or non-negative integers is common, but in fact, the Kronecker delta can be defined on an arbitrary set.

Properties 
The following equations are satisfied:

Therefore, the matrix  can be considered as an identity matrix.

Another useful representation is the following form:

In the limit . This can be derived using the formula for the geometric series.

Alternative notation
Using the Iverson bracket: 

Often, a single-argument notation  is used, which is equivalent to setting :

In linear algebra, it can be thought of as a tensor, and is written . Sometimes the Kronecker delta is called the substitution tensor.

Digital signal processing

In the study of digital signal processing (DSP), the unit sample function  represents a special case of a 2-dimensional Kronecker delta function  where the Kronecker indices include the number zero, and where one of the indices is zero.  In this case:

Or more generally where:

However, this is only a special case.  In tensor calculus, it is more common to number basis vectors in a particular dimension starting with index 1, rather than index 0.  In this case, the relation  does not exist, and in fact, the Kronecker delta function and the unit sample function are different functions that overlap in the specific case where the indices include the number 0, the number of indices is 2, and one of the indices has the value of zero.

While the discrete unit sample function and the Kronecker delta function use the same letter, they differ in the following ways. For the discrete unit sample function, it is more conventional to place a single integer index in square braces; in contrast the Kronecker delta can have any number of indexes.  Further, the purpose of the discrete unit sample function is different from the Kronecker delta function. In DSP, the discrete unit sample function is typically used as an input function to a discrete system for discovering the system function of the system which will be produced as an output of the system.  In contrast, the typical purpose of the Kronecker delta function is for filtering terms from an Einstein summation convention.

The discrete unit sample function is more simply defined as:

In addition, the Dirac delta function is often confused for both the Kronecker delta function and the unit sample function.  The Dirac delta is defined as:

Unlike the Kronecker delta function  and the unit sample function , the Dirac delta function  does not have an integer index, it has a single continuous non-integer value .

To confuse matters more, the unit impulse function is sometimes used to refer to either the Dirac delta function , or the unit sample function .

Properties of the delta function

The Kronecker delta has the so-called sifting property that for :

and if the integers are viewed as a measure space, endowed with the counting measure, then this property coincides with the defining property of the Dirac delta function

and in fact Dirac's delta was named after the Kronecker delta because of this analogous property. In signal processing it is usually the context (discrete or continuous time) that distinguishes the Kronecker and Dirac "functions". Another common practice is to represent discrete sequences with square brackets; thus: . The Kronecker delta is not the result of directly sampling the Dirac delta function.

The Kronecker delta forms the multiplicative identity element of an incidence algebra.

Relationship to the Dirac delta function
In probability theory and statistics, the Kronecker delta and Dirac delta function can both be used to represent a discrete distribution.  If the support of a distribution consists of points , with corresponding probabilities , then the probability mass function  of the distribution over  can be written, using the Kronecker delta, as

Equivalently, the probability density function  of the distribution can be written using the Dirac delta function as

Under certain conditions, the Kronecker delta can arise from sampling a Dirac delta function.  For example, if a Dirac delta impulse occurs exactly at a sampling point and is ideally lowpass-filtered (with cutoff at the critical frequency) per the Nyquist–Shannon sampling theorem, the resulting discrete-time signal will be a Kronecker delta function.

Generalizations
If it is considered as a type  tensor, the Kronecker tensor can be written
 with a covariant index  and contravariant index :

This tensor represents:
 The identity mapping (or identity matrix), considered as a linear mapping  or 
 The trace or tensor contraction, considered as a mapping 
 The map , representing scalar multiplication as a sum of outer products.

The  or multi-index Kronecker delta of order  is a type  tensor that is completely antisymmetric in its  upper indices, and also in its  lower indices.

Below, the version is presented has nonzero components scaled to be .

Definitions of the generalized Kronecker delta 
In terms of the indices, the generalized Kronecker delta is defined as:

Let  be the symmetric group of degree , then:

Using anti-symmetrization:

In terms of a  determinant:

Using the Laplace expansion (Laplace's formula) of determinant, it may be defined recursively:

where the caron, indicates an index that is omitted from the sequence.

When  (the dimension of the vector space), in terms of the Levi-Civita symbol:

Contractions of the generalized Kronecker delta 
Kronecker Delta contractions depend on the dimension of the space. For example,

where  is the dimension of the space. From this relation the full contracted delta is obtained as

The generalization of the preceding formulas is

Properties of the generalized Kronecker delta 
The generalized Kronecker delta may be used for anti-symmetrization:

From the above equations and the properties of anti-symmetric tensors, we can derive the properties of the generalized Kronecker delta:

The last formula is equivalent to the Cauchy–Binet formula.

Reducing the order via summation of the indices may be expressed by the identity

Using both the summation rule for the case  and the relation with the Levi-Civita symbol,
the summation rule of the Levi-Civita symbol is derived:

The 4D version of the last relation appears in Penrose's spinor approach to general relativity that he later generalized, while he was developing Aitken's diagrams, to become part of the technique of Penrose graphical notation. Also, this relation is extensively used in S-duality theories, especially when written in the language of differential forms and Hodge duals.

Integral representations
For any integer , using a standard residue calculation we can write an integral representation for the Kronecker delta as the integral below, where the contour of the integral goes counterclockwise around zero. This representation is also equivalent to a definite integral by a rotation in the complex plane.

The Kronecker comb
The Kronecker comb function with period  is defined (using DSP notation) as:

The Kronecker comb thus consists of an infinite series of unit impulses  units apart, and includes the unit impulse at zero. It may be considered to be the discrete analog of the Dirac comb.

Kronecker integral

The Kronecker delta is also called degree of mapping of one surface into another.

while the normal has the direction of

If  is the origin of the region, then the degree,  is given by the integral:

See also
Dirac measure
Indicator function
Levi-Civita symbol
't Hooft symbol
Unit function
XNOR gate

References

Mathematical notation
Elementary special functions